Nyac Airport  is a private airport located two miles (3 km) southwest of the central business district of Nyac, in the Bethel Census Area of the U.S. state of Alaska.

Nyac is located in the Kilbuck Mountains of southwestern Alaska, approximately 60 miles east of Bethel. Access during the summer months is by chartered flights from Bethel or Aniak.

Facilities 
Nyac Airport has two runways:
 Runway 5/23: 3,650 x 100 ft. (1,113 x 30 m), surface: gravel
 Runway 5/23: 2,600 x 70 ft

References

External links 
 Resources for this airport:
 
 
 

Airports in the Bethel Census Area, Alaska